Chandanachola is a 1975 Indian Malayalam film,  directed by Jeassy and produced by Dr. Balakrishnan. The film stars Jose Prakash, Sudheer, Vidhubala and Vincent in the lead roles. The film had musical score by K. J. Joy.

Cast

Vincent
Sudheer
Jose Prakash
Vidhubala
Baby Indira
Manavalan Joseph
Pattom Sadan
Sankaradi
Sunil
Nilambur Balan
K. R. Kumaran Nair
Kuthiravattam Pappu
Paravoor Bharathan
Reena
Sadhana
Sukumaran Nair
T. P. Madhavan
Victory Janardanan

Soundtrack

References

External links
 

1975 films
1970s Malayalam-language films